Jermaine Terrill McGhee (born December 31, 1983) is an American football defensive end who is currently a free agent. He was signed by the Kansas City Chiefs as an undrafted free agent in 2008. He played college football at Prairie View A&M, where he was ranked in the nation in sacks with 14 his senior year; he finished his college career with 24 sacks while playing defensive end for his last two years of his college career; he started as a defensive back (strong safety). McGhee has also been a member of the Buffalo Bills.

Early years
McGhee graduated from San Lorenzo High School in 2002.

Professional career

Kansas City Chiefs
On October 1, 2008, McGhee was signed to the Kansas City Chiefs' practice squad. He was released on November 13.

Buffalo Bills
McGhee was signed by the Buffalo Bills on May 12, 2009. He was placed on injured reserve on August 11. He was waived on February 18, 2010 after failing his physical with the team.

References

External links
Buffalo Bills bio

1983 births
Living people
Players of American football from California
American football defensive ends
Prairie View A&M Panthers football players
Kansas City Chiefs players
Buffalo Bills players
Chicago Rush players
Sacramento Mountain Lions players
Sportspeople from Alameda County, California
Las Vegas Locomotives players
San Antonio Talons players
People from San Lorenzo, California